João Martins is the name of:

João Baptista Martins (1927–1993), Portuguese football forward
João Carlos Martins (born 1940), Brazilian classical pianist
João Paulo Neto Martins (born 1988), Portuguese football midfielder 
João Cleófas Martins (1901–1970), Cape Verdean photographer
João Pedro Pinto Martins (born 1982), Angolan football forward